Mateus may refer to:

 Mateus (wine), a brand of wine produced in Portugal
 Mateus (Vila Real), a civil parish in Portugal
Mateus Palace, a palace in the above civil parish
 Mateus (name), Portuguese given name and surname
 Jorge & Mateus, musical duo
 Mateus (footballer, born April 1983), Mateus Versolato Júnior, Brazilian football goalkeeper
 Mateus (footballer, born June 1983), Mateus Alonso Honorio, Brazilian football defender
 Mateus (footballer, born 1987), Mateus de Oliveira Barbosa, Brazilian football defensive midfielder
 Mateus (footballer, born 1994), Mateus dos Santos Castro, Brazilian football winger
 Mateus (footballer, born 1999), Mateus Rodrigues dos Santos, Brazilian football defender

See also 
 São Mateus (disambiguation)
 Matthew (name)